Fool's Paradise is a 2006 album recorded by The Head Cat, a collaboration between Lemmy of Motörhead, Slim Jim Phantom (of The Stray Cats), and Danny B. Harvey. It features covers of mostly classic 1950s songs. It is re-release of their first album "Lemmy, Slim Jim & Danny B" recorded in September 1999. This re-release doesn't include 3 songs from original release, it has a different cover and the track list is in a different order.

While there is nothing groundbreaking in this recording, the 1950s songs that are chosen (penned by likes of Buddy Holly and members of his group) are played "commendably", keeping close to the original versions with restraint. The album received less praise from other critics.

Critical reception

Greg Prato of Allmusic refers to the album as "a much needed antidote to the computer/software enhanced state of popular music" and "a worthwhile listen for die-hard fans to hear Lemmy tackle covers of some of his favorite standards".  Bob Gottlieb wrote in Folk & Acoustic Music Exchange that the band "play some damn good music" and that the songs are "not filled with the fireball frenetic energy that can often make Rockabilly about as pleasant as the sound of a dentists drill nowadays".  However, Paul Jordan Sr. wrote the album "sounds like karaoke from a biker's bar! Bad songs sung by bad voices".

Track listing

Personnel 
Danny B.Harvey - guitar, keyboards, background vocals
Lemmy Kilmister - lead vocals, bass guitar, acoustic guitar, harmonica
Slim Jim Phantom - drums, percussion, background vocals

References 

2006 debut albums
The Head Cat albums